The 1990 Philadelphia Eagles season was the team's 58th in the National Football League (NFL).

The team made the postseason yet again with a 10–6 overall record, despite beginning the season with disappointing early-season records of 1–3 and 2–4.

The Eagles ran for 2,556 rushing yards in 1990, which is the most of any team in a single season in the 1990s.

Other season highlights were a 28–14 win at Veterans Stadium over the Washington Redskins on November 12, known as the Body Bag Game, since the defense managed to knock both Redskins quarterbacks from the contest plus several other key players. Against the Buffalo Bills in a 30–23 loss on December 2, Randall Cunningham made one of the signature plays of his career, eluding Bills Hall of Fame defensive end Bruce Smith in the end zone before launching the ball into the middle of the field to wide receiver Fred Barnett, who completed the 95-yard touchdown play.

One week prior, the Eagles avenged an opening-night loss at the Meadowlands, whipping the 10–0 New York Giants by a 31–13 score.

Following the season, the team fired head coach Buddy Ryan. Offensive coordinator Rich Kotite was promoted to replace Ryan as Eagles head coach, and would hold the position for the next four seasons.

Offseason

NFL Draft

The 1990 NFL Draft was held April 22–23, 1990.  The league also held a supplemental draft after the regular draft and before the regular season.
For the number 1 pick in the draft, the Indianapolis Colts traded with the Atlanta Falcons to select Jeff George a quarterback from Illinois

Under the rules of the draft at the time, the Eagles would pick 24th or 25th in each full round. Teams that went to Super Bowl XXIV would have last 2 picks and then teams sorted out by 1989 record in each round. The Eagles at 11–5 in the previous year tied with Los Angeles Rams. With the 22nd pick in the 1st round the Eagles selected Ben Smith a cornerback from Georgia The Eagles made 12 total picks in the 1990 draft.

Training camp
The Eagles held training camp at West Chester State University in West Chester, PA about 20 miles from Veterans Stadium where they play their home games.

Personnel

Staff

Roster

Regular season

Schedule

Note: Intra-division opponents are in bold text.

Game summaries

Week 1

Week 2

Week 3

Week 4

Week 6

Week 7

Week 8

The Porkchop Bowl

Week 9

Week 10

Source: Pro-Football-Reference.com
    
    
    
    
    
    

This game came to be known as The Body Bag Game.

Week 11

Week 12

Week 13

Week 14

Week 15

Week 16

Week 17

Standings

Playoffs

Game summaries

Wild Card

Awards and honors
 Randall Cunningham, Bert Bell Award

References

External links
 1990 Philadelphia Eagles at Pro-Football-Reference.com

Philadelphia Eagles seasons
Philadelphia Eagles
Philadelphia Eagles